Area code 716 is a telephone area code in the North American Numbering Plan (NANP) for Buffalo,  Niagara Falls, and four surrounding counties in western New York. It was one of the original North American area codes established in 1947.

History
When the American Telephone and Telegraph Company (AT&T) devised the first nationwide telephone numbering plan in the 1940s, New York state was initially divided into five numbering plan areas (NPAs), the most of any state. Each area received a distinct area code. Area code 716, one of these original area codes of October 1947, was assigned to a significant portion of central New York, as far east as Corning.

In 1954, the numbering plan area was reduced in size by merging its eastern portion with the southern portion of NPA 315, to create area code 607.

In 2001, the new area code 585 was created for Rochester and its suburbs. Until 1993, it was bounded at the Niagara River by area code 416 (now 905) in Ontario.

Prior to October 2021, area code 716 had telephone numbers assigned for the central office code 988. In 2020, 988 was designated nationwide as a dialing code for the National Suicide Prevention Lifeline, which created a conflict for exchanges that permit seven-digit dialing. This area code was therefore scheduled to transition to ten-digit dialing by October 24, 2021.

A 2022 analysis by the NANP Administrator determined that area code 716 will exhaust its central office prefixes in 2024. As a result, area code 624 is expected to be added to the 716 area before exhaustion; the exact date has not yet been announced.

Service area
The numbering plan area comprises the following counties:
 Erie County (includes city of Buffalo and surrounding suburbs)
 Cattaraugus County (includes city of Olean)
 Chautauqua County (includes cities of Jamestown and Dunkirk)
 Niagara County (includes Niagara Falls and Lockport)

Because of Olean's proximity to the 716/585 line, some Olean exchanges use area code 585, particularly those in use for Sprint Corporation cell phones.

See also
 List of New York area codes
 List of NANP area codes

References

External links

716
716
Buffalo, New York
Telecommunications-related introductions in 1947